Elias David Sassoon (27 March 1820 – 21 March 1880), an Indian merchant and banker born in Baghdad, was the second son of David Sassoon, an Iraqi-Indian philanthropist Jewish businessman involved in trade in India and the Far East, with branches at Calcutta, Shanghai, Canton, and Hong Kong; and his business, which included a monopoly of the opium-trade, extended as far as Yokohama, Nagasaki, and other cities in Japan.

He was the first of his siblings to assist the family business's expansion into China when he opened a branch of the business there in 1844. He was also involved in his father's business in Bombay, India. In 1867, Elias established his own business called "E.D. Sassoon & Co.", starting to trade in dried fruits, nankeen, metals, tea, silk, spices and camphor from modest offices in Bombay and Shanghai.

In 1878 he established the Jewish Cemetery, Chinchpokli, in memory of his son Joseph, who had died at Shanghai in 1868.

Elias died in Colombo in 1880. He had married Leah Gubbay and was father to Jacob Elias Sassoon and Edward Elias Sassoon, amongst others. His daughter Hannah married Sassoon David.

See also
Sassoon family
David Sassoon & Co.
E.D. Sassoon & Co.
Victor Sassoon
Ohel Leah Synagogue, Hong Kong was named after his wife Leah, founded with donations from Jacob's brothers.

References

1820 births
1880 deaths
Elias David
Indian people of Iraqi-Jewish descent
Jewish Chinese history
People from Baghdad
Indian people of English descent
Businesspeople from Mumbai
19th-century Indian philanthropists